The seventeenth season of British science fiction television series Doctor Who began on 1 September 1979 with the story Destiny of the Daleks, and ended with The Horns of Nimon. This was Graham Williams' final series producing Doctor Who. The script editor was Douglas Adams.

Casting

Main cast 
 Tom Baker as the Fourth Doctor
 Lalla Ward as Romana
 David Brierly as Voice of K9

Tom Baker continued as the Fourth Doctor. Lalla Ward, who played Princess Astra in the season 16 finale The Armageddon Factor, returned to the series as the newly regenerated Romana, replacing Mary Tamm in the role. After John Leeson declined to return as K9, David Brierly replaced him in the part for the season's final four serials, including Shada.

Guest stars
Davros returns in Destiny of the Daleks, this time played by David Gooderson.

Serials 

Season 17 was intended to follow the same format as had every season since Season 13, with five 4-part serials and a 6-parter closing the season out. However, the planned final serial of the season, Shada, was affected by an industrial dispute involving the BBC's technicians; while the location filming and the first studio recording session were completed, strike action by staff meant that the planned second studio session had to be cancelled. Although the dispute was resolved and plans were put in place to continue work on the story, it was eventually shelved, as the BBC was concerned that its Christmas productions might be affected. A BBC historian has suggested that by cancelling completely instead of finishing what little was required, the management could demonstrate that the strikes had consequences. Ironically, the viewer ratings of Season 17 were also affected by a strike, with the BBC's main rival, ITV, off air due to a dispute.

Broadcast
Part 4 of The Horns of Nimon saw the last appearance of the diamond-shaped logo that had been used since The Time Warrior in 1973.

The entire season was broadcast from 1 September 1979 to 12 January 1980.

Home media

VHS releases

DVD and Blu-ray releases

In print

Notes

References

Bibliography

 

1979 British television seasons
1980 British television seasons
Season 17
Season 17
17